The Nova Scotia Liquor Corporation (NSLC) is the Crown corporation which controls sales of alcoholic beverages and recreational cannabis in Nova Scotia, Canada.  It is the sole distributor for these products and runs all retail outlets (108 across the province) selling alcohol and cannabis products. The exceptions are for four private retailers in urban HRM offering beer, wine, and spirits, and, in rural areas where there is not an NSLC location, 65 "agency" liquor stores operated by private retailers on NSLC's behalf.

History
In 1910 the Nova Scotia Temperance Act was passed which enforced prohibition of alcohol sales throughout the province except in Halifax. Beginning in 1916, alcohol sales were prohibited in Halifax.

On October 31, 1929, a plebiscite was held on Nova Scotia's prohibition of alcohol sales. Over 60 percent of voters authorized the repeal of the Temperance Act, making Nova Scotia the second last province in Canada to end prohibition.

On May 1, 1930 the Nova Scotia Liquor Commission was created through legislation passed as the Liquor Control Act.

In 1946, the responsibility for licensing sites selling alcoholic beverages (e.g. bars and restaurants) was transferred to the Tavern Licence Committee (now named Liquor License Board).

The liquor commission's current head office and distribution centre was constructed in the Bayers Lake Industrial Park in 1987.

In 1995, the Gaming Control Act made the Nova Scotia Liquor Commission part of the Alcohol and Gaming Authority.

In July 2001, the organization was changed from a commission to a Crown corporation and renamed the Nova Scotia Liquor Corporation.

On December 1, 2004, the organization unveiled a new retail logo, replacing their old "Liquor Store" logo.

On October 17, 2018, the Nova Scotia Liquor Corporation became the sole authorized retailer of cannabis in Nova Scotia following the legalization of recreational cannabis.

References

External links

 Nova Scotia Liquor Corporation

Alcohol in Nova Scotia
Alcohol distribution retailers of Canada
Alcohol monopolies
Crown corporations of Nova Scotia
Canadian provincial alcohol departments and agencies
1930 establishments in Nova Scotia
Food and drink companies established in 1930
Cannabis shops in Canada
Canadian provincial cannabis departments and agencies